BRCW Type 2 may refer to:
 British Rail Class 26
 British Rail Class 27